Todor Hristov (born 25 September 1987) is a Bulgarian football midfielder who currently plays for Icelandic club Einherji

Career
Todor Hristov played his first full season in the Bulgarian top division during the 2010–2011 season when he played for Beroe Stara Zagora

Levski Sofia
On 9 June 2011 he signed for Levski Sofia. Hristov appeared in only 7 league games for Levski, and 9 in all competitions. It soon became evident that Levski's board was desperate to sell Hristov, as he was forced to train with the reserves, as well as the youth team.

Return to Beroe
On 29 February 2012, it was announced that Hristov had returned to Beroe, for a reported fee of around 180,000 leva, after failing to secure a spot in Levski's starting eleven. Hristov played a total of 9 matches for Levski (426 minutes), and only once played the full 90 minutes, in a Bulgarian Cup game against FC Bansko.

Lokomotiv Sofia
He signed with Lokomotiv Sofia in May 2013.

Career statistics
As of 24 June 2011

References

External links
 
 Profile at LevskiSofia.info

1987 births
Living people
Bulgarian footballers
Association football midfielders
PFC Marek Dupnitsa players
FC Montana players
FC Lyubimets players
PFC Nesebar players
PFC Beroe Stara Zagora players
PFC Levski Sofia players
FC Lokomotiv 1929 Sofia players
PFC Akademik Svishtov players
First Professional Football League (Bulgaria) players
Bulgarian expatriates in Iceland
Todor Hristov